Pella is a town in Moses Kotane Local Municipality in the North West province of South Africa.

References

Pella Village,a village situated on the edges of Botswana & Zeerust.Tribal information-It is stated that it is led by King Godfrey-Gasebone.Pella is not just a village but it is also the home town of Moses Kotane .

Populated places in the Moses Kotane Local Municipality